SS William E. Dodd was a Liberty ship built in the United States during World War II. She was named after William E. Dodd, the United States Ambassador to Germany from 1933 to 1937.

Construction
William E. Dodd was laid down on 19 May 1944, under a Maritime Commission (MARCOM) contract, MC hull 2308, by J.A. Jones Construction, Panama City, Florida; she was sponsored by Miss Frances Spain, and launched on 22 June 1944.

History
She was allocated to Marine Transport Lines, Inc., on 15 July 1944. On 15 May 1945, she damaged the No. 5 bearing of her main engine. Sea trials were conducted on 27 May 1945, after repairing the bearing but they were unsuccessful so now the entire crankshaft was replace. Sea trials were again conducted on 22 June 1945, but were again unsuccessful, this time the No. 6 bearing went out and needed repairing. She was able to return to the US on 24 July 1945. On 12 September 1945, she was laid up in the National Defense Reserve Fleet, in the James River Group, Lee Hall, Virginia. On 25 July 1947, she was sold to Norway, for commercial use. She was renamed Milbank and sailed under a Norwegian flag until 1958, when she was sold to Seabird Steamship Co., and reflagged for Liberia, and renamed Thanksgiving. She was scrapped in Hirao, in 1967.

References

Bibliography

 
 
 
 
 

 

Liberty ships
Ships built in Panama City, Florida
1944 ships
James River Reserve Fleet